Curtis Longino Waller (January 9, 1887 – July 11, 1950) was a United States circuit judge of the United States Court of Appeals for the Fifth Circuit and previously was a United States district judge of the United States District Court for the Northern District of Florida and the United States District Court for the Southern District of Florida.

Education and career

Born in Silver Creek, Mississippi, Waller received his Bachelor of Philosophy degree from Mississippi College in 1908 and his Bachelor of Laws from Millsaps College in 1910. Waller was a private secretary to United States Representative Pat Harrison in 1911. He was in private practice in Bay St. Louis, Mississippi from 1914 to 1927, and was a United States Army lieutenant colonel in World War I. Waller served as a member of the Mississippi House of Representatives in 1924. He resigned in 1925. Waller relocated to Florida and was in private practice in Tallahassee from 1930 to 1940. Waller was a state's attorney for the Florida 2nd Judicial Circuit in 1932 and a member of the Florida House of Representatives in 1933. Waller established, with Claude Pepper, the law firm of Waller and Pepper.

Federal judicial service

Waller was nominated by President Franklin D. Roosevelt on June 11, 1940, to the United States District Court for the Northern District of Florida and the United States District Court for the Southern District of Florida, to a new joint seat authorized by 54 Stat. 219. He was confirmed by the United States Senate on June 15, 1940, and received his commission on June 19, 1940. His service terminated on March 12, 1943, due to his elevation to the Fifth Circuit.

Waller was nominated by President Roosevelt on February 18, 1943, to the United States Court of Appeals for the Fifth Circuit, to a new seat authorized by 56 Stat. 1050. He was confirmed by the Senate on March 9, 1943, and received his commission on March 10, 1943. His service terminated on July 11, 1950, due to his death.

Honor

The west front of the Florida State Capitol is designated as Waller Park in Waller's memory.

References

Sources
 

1887 births
1950 deaths
Judges of the United States District Court for the Southern District of Florida
United States district court judges appointed by Franklin D. Roosevelt
Judges of the United States Court of Appeals for the Fifth Circuit
United States court of appeals judges appointed by Franklin D. Roosevelt
20th-century American judges
People from Lawrence County, Mississippi